The Immediate Geographic Region of Santa Bárbara-Ouro Preto is one of the 10 immediate geographic regions in the Intermediate Geographic Region of Belo Horizonte, one of the 70 immediate geographic regions in the Brazilian state of Minas Gerais and one of the 509 of Brazil, created by the National Institute of Geography and Statistics (IBGE) in 2017.

It comprises 6 municipalities:

 Barão de Cocais

 Catas Altas

 Itabirito

 Mariana

 Ouro Preto

 Santa Bárbara

References 

Geography of Minas Gerais